Perley A. Pitcher (January 27, 1877 in Pamelia, Jefferson County, New York – February 20, 1939 in Albany, New York) was an American lawyer and politician from New York. He was Temporary President of the New York State Senate in 1939.

Life
He was the son of John P. Pitcher and Mary Olive Delia (Root) Pitcher. He studied law in Watertown. He married Louella Northup Cox (1876–1947).

He was a member of the New York State Senate (37th D.) from 1925 until his death in 1939, sitting in the 148th, 149th, 150th, 151st, 152nd, 153rd, 154th, 155th, 156th, 157th, 158th, 159th, 160th, 161st and 162nd New York State Legislatures. He was the Republican Floor Leader at the New York State Constitutional Convention of 1938 and was elected Temporary President of the State Senate at the beginning of the session, in 1939.

Less than two months into the legislative session, he died in his hotel room in Albany, New York. He was buried at the North Watertown Cemetery in Watertown.

Sources
Obituary in New York Times on February 21, 1939 (subscription required)
The Pitcher Book:A Genealogical History of the Descendants of Andrew Pitcher and Margaret Russell Who Settled in Milton, Massachusetts, 1634-2007 by William Richard Phipps (pages 301f; Heritage Books, 2007) (stating wrong birthplace and dying place)

1877 births
1939 deaths
Republican Party New York (state) state senators
Politicians from Watertown, New York
Majority leaders of the New York State Senate